Mirosław Smyła (born 25 July 1969) is a Polish football manager and former player who was most recently in charge of Polish I liga side Podbeskidzie Bielsko-Biała.

References

1969 births
Living people
Sportspeople from Bytom
Polish footballers
Association football defenders
Polonia Bytom players
Concordia Knurów players
Polish football managers
Ekstraklasa managers
I liga managers
II liga managers
GKS Tychy managers
Zagłębie Sosnowiec managers
Odra Opole managers
Wigry Suwałki managers
Korona Kielce managers
Podbeskidzie Bielsko-Biała managers